Can't Back Down is the seventh studio album released by country music artist Collin Raye. It was also his last album for Epic Records, and the first album of his career not to produce any Top 40 country hits. "Ain't Nobody Gonna Take That from Me", the first single, reached #43 on the Hot Country Songs charts. "What I Need", the second single, failed to chart.

Critical reception
Maria Konicki Dinoia of Allmusic rated the album three stars out of five. She considered it "in much the same vein" as his previous albums, saying that "fans will come to love and appreciate" it.

Track listing
"Gypsy Honeymoon" (Kim Carnes, Collin Ellingson) – 3:49
"It Could Be That Easy" (Tom Damphier, Gene LeSage) – 3:27
"Ain't Nobody Gonna Take That from Me" (Rivers Rutherford, Annie Tate, Sam Tate) – 4:13
"What I Need" (Karen Taylor-Good, Jason Blume) – 3:34
"Dancing with No Music Playing" (Don Ellis, Billy Montana) – 3:51
"You Always Get to Me" (Angela Lauer, Tom Douglas) – 4:13 
"End of the World" (Billy Mann) – 3:40
"One Desire" (Jane Bach, Tammy Hyler, Kevin Haynie) – 5:12
"Young as We're Ever Gonna Be" (Collin Raye, Scott Wray) – 3:49
"Dear Life" (Christi Dannemiller, LeSage) – 4:34
"What I Did for Love" (Brent Maher, Thom Schuyler) – 3:09
"I Can Let Go Now" (Michael McDonald) – 2:42

Personnel
As listed in liner notes.

Eddie Bayers – drums
Mike Brignardello – bass guitar
Kim Carnes – background vocals
Billy Davis – background vocals
Chip Davis – background vocals
Stuart Duncan – fiddle, mandolin
Paul Franklin – steel guitar
Sonny Garrish – steel guitar
Aubrey Haynie – fiddle, mandolin
Wes Hightower – background vocals
David Hungate – bass guitar
Little Big Town – background vocals
B. James Lowry – acoustic guitar
Brent Mason – electric guitar
Steve Nathan – piano, keyboards
Gary Prim – piano, keyboards
Collin Raye – lead vocals
Matt Rollings – piano, keyboards
Brent Rowan – electric guitar
John Wesley Ryles – background vocals
Jeffrey Steele – background vocals
Russell Terrell – background vocals
Biff Watson – acoustic guitar

Strings on "I Can Let Go Now" conducted and arranged by Steve Dorff.

Chart performance

References

2001 albums
Collin Raye albums
Epic Records albums
Albums produced by James Stroud